Coleophora suaedae is a moth of the family Coleophoridae. It is found in the United States, including California.

The larvae feed on the leaves of Suaeda suffrudescens.

References

suaedae
Moths of North America
Moths described in 1915